Bing Xia is a Chinese American scientist and professor at the Rutgers Cancer Institute of New Jersey, where he directs the Xia Laboratory. He is best known for his discovery of the PALB2 tumor suppressor gene.

Background 

Xia was born and raised in China and earned a B.S. degree in Biochemistry from Wuhan University in 1992.  He migrated to United States to pursue his graduate education at the University of Medicine and Dentistry of New Jersey (now Rutgers Biomedical and Health Sciences) in 1996. He completed his  Ph.D. degree in Biochemistry and Molecular Biology in 2001, and subsequently completed postdoctoral work at Dana-Farber Cancer Institute and Harvard Medical School. In 2007, Xia returned to New Jersey and started his independent laboratory at Rutgers Cancer Institute of New Jersey and has been there ever since. He was promoted to associate professor in 2013 and full professor in 2019.

Work 
Xia is a researcher focused on elucidating the molecular mechanisms and developmental path for PALB2/BRCA associated cancers with the goal of enhancing cancer treatment or prevention.

Publications

References 

Chinese scientists
Living people
Year of birth missing (living people)
University of Medicine and Dentistry of New Jersey alumni
Wuhan University alumni
American medical researchers
Cancer researchers